This is a list of classical music composers by era. With the exception of the overview, the Modernist era has been combined with the Postmodern.

Overview

Medieval era 
See List of Medieval composers and Medieval music.

Renaissance era 
See List of Renaissance composers and Renaissance music.

Baroque era 
See List of Baroque composers and Baroque music.

Turlough O'Carolan 1670-1738

 Classical era See List of Classical era composers and Classical period (music). Romantic era See List of Romantic-era composers and Romantic music.James Scott Skinner 1843-1927

 20th century/contemporary/modern/postmodern See List of 20th-century classical composers by birth date and 20th-century classical music.See also List of 21st-century classical composers.''

21st century/postmodern

See also 
 List of composers by name
 Lists of composers
Women in Music

External links
 Clickable and searchable version of graphical composers timeline with groups

Composers by era
Classical
Composers, classical
Composers, classical
History of classical music

de:Komponist#Komponisten (Klassik) - Grafische Übersicht